In the Mouth of Madness is a soundtrack by John Carpenter and Jim Lang for the film In the Mouth of Madness. It was released in 1995 through DRG Records. "In the Mouth of Madness", the first track off the soundtrack is hard rock mixed with ambient music and dark ambient.

Track listing

Personnel
 John Carpenter – synthesizers, samples, voices, guitar on "Robby's Office", production
 Jim Lang – synthesizers, samples, voices, percussion, synthesizer programming, sound design, production, mixing
 Dave Davies – guitar solos on "In the Mouth of Madness"
 Josh Sklair – guitar on "In the Mouth of Madness"
 Dennis Belfield – bass on "In the Mouth of Madness"
 Mike Baird – drums on "In the Mouth of Madness"
 John Vigran – mixing

References

John Carpenter soundtracks
1995 soundtrack albums
Horror film soundtracks
Film scores